This is a list of forests of the Western Cape province of South Africa.

List of Forests in the Western Cape, South Africa
These are generally examples of Southern Afrotemperate Forest, the predominant indigenous forest-type in the Western Cape.

 Cecilia Forest
 Grootvadersbosch
 Kirstenbosch
 Knysna Forest
 Newlands Forest
 Orangekloof Forest
 Platbos

See also

 KwaZulu-Cape coastal forest mosaic

Western Cape
Forests of South Africa
Geography of the Western Cape
Forests